Radoševići is a place name which may refer to:

in Bosnia-Herzegovina
Radoševići, a village in the municipality of Srebrenica, Republika Srpska
Radoševići, Vareš, a village in the municipality of Vareš, Zenica-Doboj Canton, Federation of Bosnia and Herzegovina

in Croatia
Radoševići, a location in the municipality of Vrbovsko, Primorje-Gorski Kotar County.